James Waller Bird (19 November 1808 – 20 February 1876) was an English cleric and cricketer with amateur status. He was born at Little Waltham near Chelmsford in Essex and was educated at Winchester College and Wadham College, Oxford, and played first-class cricket for Oxford University 1827–29. He became a Church of England priest and was rector of Foulsham, Norfolk, from 1855 until his death.

Bird married in 1850 Laura Beauchamp-Proctor, daughter of George Edward Beauchamp-Proctor, and they had ten children. He died at Paddington, London in 1876.

References

1808 births
1876 deaths
English cricketers
English cricketers of 1826 to 1863
Oxford University cricketers
People educated at Winchester College
Alumni of Wadham College, Oxford
19th-century English Anglican priests
People from Broadland (district)
Norfolk cricketers